The 2007-08 Rugby-Bundesliga was the 37th edition of this competition and the 88th edition of the German rugby union championship. The season went from 25 August 2007 to 31 May 2008, ending with the relegation final.

Overview

In 2007-08, eight teams played a home-and-away season with a final between the top two teams at the end, which was won by the SC 1880 Frankfurt. It was the club's fifth German title and its first in 83 years, having last won it in 1925. It was a rematch of the 2006-07 final, also played in Frankfurt am Main, which SC 1880 had lost to Heidelberg 15-23. Alongside the national championship final, the 2nd Bundesliga final was played as a curtain raiser for the game.

Last placed RK Heusenstamm would have been relegated but the league was expanded to nine teams for 2008-09 and no team had to drop down to the 2nd Bundesliga. This was decided on 19 July 2008 at the annual meeting of the German rugby association. The decision was made to expand the league to ten teams for the 2009-10 season.

Nominally, the eight placed team in the league would be relegated while the seventh placed team had to play the loser of the 2nd Bundesliga final for one more league place. The 2nd Bundesliga champion is directly promoted, which was the RK 03 Berlin in 2008.

The 2007-08 final was sponsored by the French bank Société Générale. It was not broadcast live on television but the Deutsches Sportfernsehen showed one hour of highlights the following Monday.

Bundesliga table

Relegated: none
Promoted: RK 03 Berlin

Bundesliga results

Results table

Key

Round 1

Round 2

Round 3

Round 4

Round 5

Round 6

Round 7

Round 8

Round 9

Round 10

Round 11

Round 12

Round 13

Round 14

Promotion/relegation play-off

2nd Bundesliga final

Relegation match

Final

2nd Bundesliga tables

South/West

Promoted to Bundesliga: none
Relegated from Bundesliga: none
Relegated from 2nd Bundesliga: none
Promoted to 2nd Bundesliga: Heidelberger RK II

North/East

Promoted to Bundesliga: RK 03 Berlin
Relegated from Bundesliga: none
Relegated from 2nd Bundesliga: none
Promoted to 2nd Bundesliga: RU Hohen Neuendorf, SG Schwalbe/DRC Hannover II

References

External links
 rugbyweb.de - Rugby-Bundesliga table & results  
 Rugby-Journal - Bundesliga table & results  
 Totalrugby.de - Bundesliga table & results 

2007–08
2007–08 in German rugby union
Germany